Elections to the East Lothian District Council took place in May 1992, alongside elections to the councils of Scotland's various other districts.

Ward Results

Labour (9)
 Musselburgh East
 Musselburgh Central
 Musselburgh South
 Musselburgh West
 Tranent/Ormiston
 Carberry
 Prestonpans West
 Prestonpans East
 Lammermuir

Conservative (7)
 Cockenzie
 Gladsmuir
 Haddington
 Direleton
 Dunbar
 East Linton
 North Berwick

SNP (1) 
 Tranent North

References

1992
1992 Scottish local elections